The Malta national handball team represents the Malta Handball Association in international handball matches held under the auspices of the European Handball Federation. Players for the national team have always been selected from the four competing handball teams on Malta.

IHF Emerging Nations Championship record
2015 – 8th place
2017 – 13th place
2019 – 12th place
2023 – Qualified

External links
Official website
IHF profile

Men's national handball teams
Handball
Handball in Malta